Admiral Charles Duncan Johnson, CB, DSO, MVO (26 March 1869 – 26 June 1930) was a Royal Navy officer who became Admiral Superintendent of Malta Dockyard.

First-class cricket
While stationed in British India, Johnson played two first-class cricket matches for the Europeans cricket team in 1893.

Naval career
Promoted to captain on 31 December 1909, Johnson became commanding officer of the cruiser HMS Drake in November 1911, commanding officer of the cruiser HMS Powerful in January 1912 and commanding officer of the cruiser HMS Minerva in December 1912 . He went on to be commanding officer of the cruiser HMS Dido in August 1913 and, having been promoted to commodore, became Second in Command of the Dover Patrol in November 1915 during the First World War.

For his assistance during the relief efforts of the 1908 Messina earthquake, he was appointed a Commander of the Order of the Crown of Italy in 1912. In 1915 he received letters on vellum in connection with operations during the sinking of submarine SM U-8. In 1916 he was appointed a Companion of the Distinguished Service Order, a Croix d'Officier of the Legion of Honour and a Commandeur of the Order of Leopold.

After the War, Johnson became commanding officer of the battleship HMS Marlborough in October 1918 and was appointed a Companion of the Order of the Bath "for valuable services in command of HMS Marlborough during the operations
in Kaffa Bay, Russia" in 1919. He went on to be Rear Admiral, Reserve Fleet in April 1921 and Admiral Superintendent Malta Dockyard in February 1924 . He was promoted to vice admiral on 1 March 1926 and to full admiral on 8 May 1930.

References

1869 births
1930 deaths
Irish cricketers
Europeans cricketers
Royal Navy admirals
Companions of the Order of the Bath
Companions of the Distinguished Service Order
Members of the Royal Victorian Order
Recipients of the Legion of Honour